General Felipe Ángeles (municipality) is a town and municipality in the center of the state of Puebla in south-eastern Mexico. It is named after General Felipe Ángeles.

Municipal President Miguel Antonio Vázquez died on August 24, 2020, during the COVID-19 pandemic in Mexico.

References

Municipalities of Puebla